Eudoxia Epiphania (also known as Epiphania, Eudocia or Eudokia) was the only daughter of the Byzantine Emperor Heraclius and his first wife Eudokia. She was born at Constantinople on July 7, 611 CE, baptized on August 15, and crowned (in the oratory of St. Stephen in the palace) October 4 of the same year.

When she was about 15 years old, her father allied with the Western Göktürks and the Khazars against the Sassanian Persians and the Eurasian Avars. To secure the assistance of the Turks, Eudoxia was promised in marriage to either the Turkic ruler Ziebel (probably Tong Yabghu)  or his son. She was afterwards sent to her Turkic husband, but the news of his death stopped her journey, and prevented the consummation of the marriage.

Notes

Resources
 Artamonov, Mikhail. Istoriya Khazar. Leningrad, 1962.
 Brook, Kevin Alan. The Jews of Khazaria. 2nd ed. Rowman & Littlefield Publishers, Inc, 2006.
 Christian, David. A History of Russia, Mongolia and Central Asia. Blackwell, 1999.
 Ducange. Familiae Byzantinae. Paris, 1680. p. 118.
 Dunlop, Douglas M. History of the Jewish Khazars. Princeton Univ. Press, 1954.
 Gibbon, Edward. The History of the Decline and Fall of the Roman Empire. London, 1845. Ch. 46.

See also

List of Byzantine emperors
List of Roman and Byzantine Empresses

External links
Garland, Lynda (2000). Epiphania (daughter of Heraclius). An Online Encyclopedia of Roman Emperors

Heraclian dynasty
Daughters of Byzantine emperors
People from Constantinople
7th-century Byzantine people
611 births
Year of death missing
Heraclius